A trafficker is a smuggler.

Trafficker may also refer to:

Drug trafficker
Human trafficker
Sex trafficker
 Traffickers, 2012 South Korean film
 The Traffickers (TV series), a 2016 investigative series
The Traffickers, a book in W. E. B. Griffin's Badge of Honor novel series

See also
 Traffic (disambiguation)